The Goya Award for Best Actress (Spanish: Premio Goya a la mejor interpretación femenina protagonista) is one of the Goya Awards, Spain's principal national film awards.

Since its inception, the award has been given to 26 actresses. At the 1st Goya Awards ceremony held in 1987, Amparo Rivelles was the first winner of this award for her role as Laura in We Must Undo the House. Carmen Maura has received the most awards in this category with three wins. Penélope Cruz was nominated on eleven occasions, winning two times.

As of the 2023 ceremony, Laia Costa is the most recent winner in this category for her role as Amaia in Lullaby.

Winners and nominees
In the following table, the years are listed as per Academy convention, and generally correspond to the year of film release; the ceremonies are always held the following year.

1980s

1990s

2000s

2010s

2020s

Multiple wins and nominations

The following individuals received two or more Best Actress awards:

The following individuals received three or more Best Actress nominations:

References

External links 
Official site
IMDb: Goya Awards

Actress
Film awards for lead actress